Acarodynerus queenslandicus is a species of wasp in the family Vespidae. It was described by Giordani Soika in 1962.

References

Potter wasps
Insects described in 1962